

Film and television awards

Critics' Choice Movie Awards

Online Film & Television Association Awards

Pan-American Association of Film & Television Journalists Awards

Phoenix Film Critics Society Awards

Primetime Emmy Awards

Screen Actors Guild Awards

Theater awards

Broadway.com Audience Choice Awards

Clarence Derwent Awards

Drama Desk Awards

Drama League Awards

Lucille Lortel Awards

Obie Awards

Outer Critics Circle Awards

Tony Awards

Notes
 A  Shared with Josh Brolin, James Franco, Victor Garber, Emile Hirsch, Sean Penn, Diego Luna, and Stephen Spinella
 B  Shared with the cast
 C  Connie Britton, Taissa Farmiga, Jessica Lange, Dylan McDermott, and Evan Peters
 D  Shared with Josh Brolin, Joseph Cross, James Franco, Victor Garber, Emile Hirsch, Diego Luna, Sean Penn, and Alison Pill
 E  Shared with Jennifer Garner, Jared Leto, Matthew McConaughey, Dallas Roberts, and Steve Zahn

See also

 Denis O'Hare filmography

References

 
 
 
 
 "Denis O'Hare – Milestones". TCM Movie Database. TBS. tcm.com. Retrieved 21 October 2014.

External links
 
 
 
 

Ohare, Denis